The 2022–23 NHL season is the 106th season of operation (105th season of play) of the National Hockey League (NHL). The regular season began on October 7, 2022, when the San Jose Sharks and the Nashville Predators played the first of two games in Prague, Czech Republic as a part of the 2022 NHL Global Series.

League business

Sponsorships
In addition to sponsor logos on helmets (helmet entitlement partner), teams will now be allowed to also sell another sponsor placement on their players' jerseys (jersey patch partner) this season.

The following teams have announced their jersey sponsors:
Arizona: Gila River Resort & Casino (home)
Boston: Rapid7
Columbus: Safelite
Florida: AutoNation (away)
Minnesota: TRIA
Montreal: RBC (home)
Pittsburgh: Highmark (home)
St. Louis: Stifel
Toronto: Dairy Farmers of Ontario
Vancouver: TD Bank (home)
Vegas: Circa Las Vegas (home)
Washington: Caesars Sportsbook (home)
Winnipeg: Canada Life

Digital rink board advertisements
After previous trials during the 2016 World Cup of Hockey and 2020 NHL All-Star Game, the NHL deployed Supponor technology at all arenas this season. This allows the digital replacement and insertion of advertising on the rink boards on selected camera angles, which can be localized for individual regional, national, and international broadcasters. These advertising units include logo placements similar to the boards seen in person (which will still be shown on camera angles that do not support ad replacement), and larger "zone"-based units across sections of the boards, or the entire board.

Entry draft

The 2022 NHL Entry Draft was held on July 7–8, 2022, at the Bell Centre in Montreal, the home of the Montreal Canadiens. Juraj Slafkovsky was selected first overall by the Canadiens.

Preseason games in Europe
The league held preseason games in Europe for the first time since 2019. The Nashville Predators played SC Bern at PostFinance Arena in Bern, Switzerland, on October 3, 2022. The San Jose Sharks played Eisbären Berlin at Mercedes-Benz Arena in Berlin, Germany, on October 4.

Coaching changes

(*) Indicates interim.

Front office changes

(*) indicates interim.

Arena changes
 The Arizona Coyotes signed a three-year agreement to play at Mullett Arena on the campus of Arizona State University in Tempe, Arizona. The team's previous home Gila River Arena chose not to renew their lease agreement, and ASU's arena is only being used as a temporary home while the Coyotes explore the construction of a new venue.

Regular season
The regular season began on October 7, 2022, and will end on April 14, 2023.

International games
The league held regular season games in Europe for the first time since the 2019–20 season. The Nashville Predators and San Jose Sharks played their first two regular season games against each other on October 7 and 8, 2022, at O2 Arena in Prague, Czech Republic. Then, the Columbus Blue Jackets and Colorado Avalanche played two games on November 4 and 5, at Nokia Arena in Tampere, Finland.

Outdoor games

The league held the following outdoor games:
 The Winter Classic was held on January 2, 2023, at Fenway Park in Boston, with the Boston Bruins hosting the Pittsburgh Penguins.
 The Stadium Series was held on February 18, 2023, at Carter–Finley Stadium in Raleigh, North Carolina, with the Carolina Hurricanes hosting the Washington Capitals.

All-Star Game

The 2023 All-Star Game took place on February 4, 2023, at FLA Live Arena in Sunrise, Florida, the home of the Florida Panthers.

Postponed games
 Two Nashville Predators home games, against Colorado on November 25 and Columbus on November 26, were postponed due to damage caused by a broken water main at Bridgestone Arena. The one against Columbus was rescheduled to January 17, and the one against Colorado was rescheduled to April 14 (the day after the regular season was originally scheduled to end).
 Due to a severe winter storm, two December 23 games were postponed. The Detroit Red Wings–Ottawa Senators game was rescheduled to February 27. The Tampa Bay Lightning–Buffalo Sabres game was moved to March 4, replacing the originally scheduled Philadelphia Flyers–Buffalo game, which was rescheduled to January 9. With Buffalo Niagara International Airport remaining closed due to a travel ban out of the area, the Buffalo–Columbus game on December 27 was also postponed, and it was rescheduled to April 14.

Standings

Eastern Conference

Western Conference

Statistics

Scoring leaders
The following players led the league in regular season points at the completion of games played on March 19, 2023.

Leading goaltenders
The following goaltenders led the league in regular season goals against average at the completion of games played on March 19, 2023, while playing at least 1,920 minutes.

Uniforms

Wholesale team changes
 The Arizona Coyotes introduced a new "Desert Night" alternate, featuring the team's former maroon and sand colors and a new wordmark.
 The Buffalo Sabres introduced an updated version of the black bison head (known as the "goathead") jersey, originally introduced in 1996, as a third jersey for this season.
 The Calgary Flames introduced an all-black version of their 1998 third jersey as their new alternate jersey, similar to their 2020–21 Reverse Retro uniforms.
 The Carolina Hurricanes promoted their black alternate uniform to their primary home set. They also unveiled a throwback 1997 to 2007 red alternate in commemoration of the franchise's 25th anniversary in Carolina.
 The Columbus Blue Jackets changed their road pants to blue.
 The Edmonton Oilers changed their primary uniforms to the royal blue/orange/white set previously worn from 1981 to 1996, and from 2011 to 2017. The midnight blue alternates were retained.
 The San Jose Sharks unveiled new uniforms which were mainly inspired by the team's original 1991 to 1998 set. These uniforms will also feature teal pants, gloves, and home helmets.
 The Vancouver Canucks unveiled a modernized version of their 1990s black/red/yellow "Flying Skate" uniforms as their new alternate jersey.
 The Vegas Golden Knights promoted their gold alternate jerseys to primary home jersey, as part of their "Golden Age" campaign.

"Reverse Retro" jerseys
Each NHL team wore "Reverse Retro" jerseys for select games during the 2020–21 season, utilizing a variety of uniform designs and color schemes from the teams' histories. After several months of speculation, the NHL formally announced the return of the "Reverse Retro" program for the 2022–23 season on October 19, 2022, with new designs. All 32 jerseys were formally revealed the next day on October 20, with all containing a vintage-styled orange and black NHL shield logo. The jerseys for the 2023 NHL All-Star Game, revealed in late January 2023, were also revealed to be part of the program.

League-wide
 All-Star Game: The same design as those used from the 1994 to 1997 All-Star Games, but recolored in black, teal, and pink, reflecting the South Florida setting of the game.

Metropolitan Division
Carolina Hurricanes: The current away jersey, but in red with black stripes.
Columbus Blue Jackets: The team's first third jersey in 2003, but in black with light blue stripes (the latter taken from their current third jerseys).
New Jersey Devils: 1982 throwbacks, the team's first season after relocating from Denver, in Colorado Rockies colors. This jersey also commemorates the 40th anniversary of the team's relocation.
New York Islanders: 1995 throwbacks featuring the infamous "Fisherman" logo, but with most of the teal removed and the wave pattern, numbers, and name bars simplified.
New York Rangers: 1996 alternate jerseys that feature the head of the Statue of Liberty, similar to their first Reverse Retro, but now in royal blue with red sleeves.
Philadelphia Flyers: 1975 throwbacks, commemorating the team's back-to-back Stanley Cup championships, but with the black and orange stripes swapped.
Pittsburgh Penguins: 1992 throwbacks featuring the "robo-penguin" logo, except in black, similar to an unused concept from their 1992 rebrand.
Washington Capitals: 1995 throwbacks featuring the "screaming eagle," except with the blue and black swapped; the "2005" in the collar commemorates Alexander Ovechkin's rookie year, rather than the year of the jersey.

Atlantic Division
Boston Bruins: The team's first third jersey in 1995, featuring the "pooh bear" logo, but in white.
Buffalo Sabres: 1996 "goathead" throwbacks, but in the team's current color scheme.
Detroit Red Wings: The team's 1991 NHL 75th Anniversary jersey, but with a red base and black stripes.
Florida Panthers: 1998 throwbacks, but with the secondary palm tree and hockey stick logo as the crest, on the light blue from their 2009 third "JetBlue" jersey.
Montreal Canadiens: 1979 throwbacks, but with red swapped for a light blue based on the Montreal Expos, Montreal's Major League Baseball team from 1969 to 2004. The year commemorates the Expos' introduction of Youppi!, who now serves as the Canadiens' mascot.
Ottawa Senators: 2007 throwbacks, commemorating the franchise's trip to the Stanley Cup Finals, but in a two-tone black and red, with the current main crest in place of the original 2007 one.
Tampa Bay Lightning: The team's first third jersey from 1997, featuring the "storm" design, but now in white.
Toronto Maple Leafs: 1962 throwbacks, but with blue and white inverted.

Central Division
Arizona Coyotes: The team's first third jersey in 1999, similar to their first Reverse Retro, but now in burnt orange instead of the previous Reverse Retro's purple or the original green.
Chicago Blackhawks: 1938 throwbacks, but with a "Chicago" wordmark in place of a crest, and the black and red inverted.
Colorado Avalanche: 1995 throwbacks, but in the colors of the Colorado state flag, with a "C" crest also taken from the flag.
Dallas Stars: 1993 throwbacks, but in black with victory green shoulders instead of white with black shoulders, and the logos featuring silver instead of gold.
Minnesota Wild: Features the current Wild logo with the style and colors of the 1978 Minnesota North Stars jerseys, similar to their first Reverse Retro, but now primarily in green instead of white.
Nashville Predators: The team's first third jersey in 2001, but with the primarily mustard-yellow color replaced by the team's current shade of gold.
St. Louis Blues: 1966 prototype jerseys, but in gold instead of blue.
Winnipeg Jets: 1990 throwbacks, but in the team's current color scheme.

Pacific Division
Anaheim Ducks: 1993 throwbacks, but in the team's current color scheme.
Calgary Flames: 1995 "pedestal" throwbacks, but in black instead of white.
Edmonton Oilers: The team's first third jersey in 2001, featuring the "oil drop gear" logo designed by artist and former Oilers co-owner Todd McFarlane, but with the silver trim replaced by orange.
Los Angeles Kings: 1982 throwbacks commemorating the 40th anniversary of the Miracle on Manchester, but in white instead of gold.
San Jose Sharks: 1974 California Golden Seals jerseys, but featuring a "Sharks" wordmark in place of "Seals," and striping colors inverted.
Seattle Kraken: The 1951 jerseys of the Seattle Ironmen of the Pacific Coast Hockey League (PCHL), but with the Kraken crest and colors.
Vancouver Canucks: 1962 Johnny Canuck throwbacks from the Western Hockey League (WHL) team of the same name, who became the NHL Canucks in 1970, with current colors.
Vegas Golden Knights: A diagonal "Vegas" wordmark inspired by vintage signage from the Excalibur and Stardust casinos, and linked to the 1995 Las Vegas Thunder of the International Hockey League (IHL). The jersey also contains multiple glow-in-the-dark elements.

Milestones

First games

The following is a list of notable players who played their first NHL game during the 2022–23 season, listed with their first team.

Major milestones reached

 On October 20, 2022, Minnesota Wild defenseman Alex Goligoski played his 1,000th NHL game, becoming the 371st player to reach the mark.
 On October 22, 2022, Nashville Predators general manager David Poile became the first-ever general manager to oversee 3,000 regular season NHL games.
 On October 25, 2022, Vegas Golden Knights forward Phil Kessel played his 990th consecutive NHL game, setting a new record for consecutive games played, and surpassing the record previously held by Keith Yandle.
 On October 28, 2022, New York Islanders forward Josh Bailey played his 1,000th NHL game, becoming the 372nd player to reach the mark.
 On November 5, 2022, Washington Capitals forward Alexander Ovechkin scored his 787th goal as a Capital, setting a new record for goals with one franchise, and surpassing the record previously held by Gordie Howe.
 On November 17, 2022, Vegas Golden Knights forward Phil Kessel became the first player in NHL history to play 1,000 consecutive games.
 On November 20, 2022, Pittsburgh Penguins forward Evgeni Malkin played his 1,000th NHL game, becoming the 373rd player to reach the mark.
 On November 21, 2022, Boston Bruins forward Patrice Bergeron recorded his 1,000th point, becoming the 94th player to reach the mark.
 On November 21, 2022, Colorado Avalanche defenseman Cale Makar recorded his 200th point in his 195th NHL game, becoming the fastest defenseman to 200 points in NHL history, and surpassing the record previously held by Sergei Zubov. Additionally, Makar became the first defenseman in NHL history to record 200 points in fewer than 200 games.
 On November 21, 2022, Nashville Predators general manager David Poile became the first-ever general manager to win 1,500 regular season NHL games.
 On November 21, 2022, New York Islanders forward Cal Clutterbuck recorded his 3,633rd hit, becoming the all-time leader in hits since the statistic began to be tracked, and surpassing the record previously held by Dustin Brown.
 On November 29, 2022, Seattle Kraken goaltender Martin Jones allowed eight goals in a 9–8 overtime win against the Los Angeles Kings, becoming the first goaltender to allow eight or more goals and record a victory since Mike Vernon in 1991.
 On November 29, 2022, Washington Capitals forward Alexander Ovechkin scored his 403rd road goal, setting a new record for road goals, and surpassing the record previously held by Wayne Gretzky.
 On December 1, 2022, Tampa Bay Lightning forward Steven Stamkos recorded his 1,000th point, becoming the 95th player to reach the mark.
 On December 7, 2022, Buffalo Sabres forward Tage Thompson scored five goals in one game, becoming the 48th player in NHL history to do so. Thompson also became the fourth player in league history to score four first-period goals in one game.
 On December 10, 2022, Detroit Red Wings forward David Perron played his 1,000th NHL game, becoming the 374th player to reach the mark.
 On December 13, 2022, Washington Capitals forward Alexander Ovechkin scored his 136th game-opening goal, setting a new record for game-opening goals, and surpassing the record previously held by Jaromir Jagr.
 On December 13, 2022, Washington Capitals forward Alexander Ovechkin scored his 800th goal, becoming the third player to reach the mark.
 On December 22, 2022, Washington Capitals forward Alexander Ovechkin registered his 6,210th shot on goal, setting a new record for shots on goal, and surpassing the record previously held by Ray Bourque.
 On December 23, 2022, Washington Capitals forward Alexander Ovechkin scored his 802nd goal, surpassing Gordie Howe (801) for second all-time in NHL goals.
 On December 29, 2022, Winnipeg Jets forward Sam Gagner played his 1,000th NHL game, becoming the 375th player to reach the mark.
 On December 31, 2022, Los Angeles Kings defenseman Alexander Edler played his 1,000th NHL game, becoming the 376th player to reach the mark.
 On January 14, 2023, Washington Capitals forward Alexander Ovechkin recorded his 17th 30-goal season, tying the league record for most 30-goal seasons held by Mike Gartner.
 On January 16, 2023, Boston Bruins forward David Krejci played his 1,000th NHL game, becoming the 377th player to reach the mark.
 On January 18, 2023, Tampa Bay Lightning forward Steven Stamkos scored his 500th career goal, becoming the 47th player to reach the mark.
 On January 29, 2023, Toronto Maple Leafs forward John Tavares played his 1,000th NHL game, becoming the 378th player to reach the mark.
 On February 6, 2023, Dallas Stars forward Jamie Benn played his 1,000th NHL game, becoming the 379th player to reach the mark.
 On February 25, 2023, Boston Bruins goaltender Linus Ullmark became the 13th goaltender in NHL history to score a goal in an NHL game.
 On February 26, 2023, Toronto Maple Leafs defenseman Mark Giordano blocked his 2,045th shot, becoming the all-time leader in blocked shots since the statistic began to be tracked, and surpassing the record previously held by Kris Russell.
 On March 1, 2023, Edmonton Oilers forward Connor McDavid scored two goals against the Toronto Maple Leafs, becoming the fifth player in NHL history to record multiple goals in five consecutive games.
 On March 2, 2023, Ottawa Senators forward Derick Brassard played his 1,000th NHL game, becoming the 380th player to reach the mark.
 On March 2, 2023, the Boston Bruins recorded their 100th point of the season in their 61st game, becoming the fastest team to 100 points in NHL history, and surpassing the record previously held by the 1976–77 Montreal Canadiens.
 On March 11, 2023, the Boston Bruins recorded their 50th win of the season in their 64th game, becoming the fastest team to 50 wins in NHL history, and surpassing the record previously held by both the 1995–96 Detroit Red Wings and 2018–19 Tampa Bay Lightning.

Broadcast rights

Canadian media

National
This is the ninth season of the league's 12-year Canadian national broadcast rights deal with Sportsnet. This includes Sportnet's sub-licensing agreements to air Saturday Hockey Night in Canada games on CBC Television and French-language broadcasts on TVA Sports. Sportsnet has discontinued the Hometown Hockey format for its Monday-night national games and replaced it with Rogers Monday Night Hockey. The schedule includes two special Friday editions of Hockey Night in Canada on January 13 and 27, and the Hockey Day in Canada games on January 21.

NHL Live, the digital streaming package for both national and out-of-market games, has been discontinued. Out-of-market games now stream exclusively on Sportsnet Now Premium, albeit with reduced functionality with no home/away or radio broadcast features available.
This follows the league's trend of moving out-of-market streaming rights directly onto a media partner's platform, after the previous season when ESPN+ took over the U.S. rights from the league's in-house NHL.tv.

Personnel
Hometown Hockey co-host Tara Slone left Sportsnet entirely after the format was discontinued.

The Winnipeg Jets hired Dan Robertson as the team's new TV play-by-play announcer, replacing Dennis Beyak.

TSN analyst Mike Johnson replaced Ray Ferraro as a color commentator of the network's Toronto Maple Leafs broadcasts. Ferraro departed TSN to focus primarily on his duties as the lead color commentator on ESPN and ABC's NHL broadcasts in the United States.

U.S. media

National
This is the second season of the league's seven-year U.S. national broadcast rights deals with the ESPN family of networks and Turner Sports.

ESPN is airing exclusive regular season games on selected Tuesdays, Thursdays, and weekends, while ESPN2 is scheduled to air at least one game on April 1. ABC will continue to air games on selected Saturdays during the second half of the season. ESPN+ and Hulu will exclusively stream games throughout the season, primarily on most Tuesdays, Thursdays, and weekends. ESPN+ will also stream all ABC games, several of the ESPN games, as well as out-of-market games. The All-Star Game and the Stadium Series will be on ABC, and ESPN will have the All-Star Skills Competition. NHL content on ESPN+, including out-of-market games, will be branded under the new title "NHL Power Play". On March 14, Disney Channel will produce an alternative broadcast of the Washington Capitals–New York Rangers game, using the league's player and puck tracking system to render a live, real-time animation of players modeled after characters on the animated show Big City Greens.

Turner is airing regular season games primarily on TNT, with TBS, truTV, and HLN being used as an overflow channel. Their games include Wednesday-night national games, selected Sunday games during the second half of the season, a Thanksgiving Showdown doubleheader on Black Friday, and the Winter Classic. Unlike last year, not all TNT's games are exclusive and will be blacked out in one of the participating teams' market in favor of the local broadcaster's feed.

NHL Network continues to nationally televise selected regular season games not broadcast by either ESPN or TNT. The network also produces its own game broadcasts on Saturday and Sunday afternoons as part of the NHL Network Showcase series.

Local
In September 2022, Ted Leonsis's Monumental Sports & Entertainment bought out NBCUniversal's ownership stake in NBC Sports Washington, which carries broadcasts of the Washington Capitals and the NBA's Washington Wizards, both Monumental-owned teams. Monumental initially took minority ownership of the network in 2016. NBC will provide transitional corporate, technical, and distribution support up to 18 months after the sale, and Monumental plans to rebrand the network after the 2022–23 season.

On February 24, 2023, the AT&T SportsNet regional sports networks sent letters to the Pittsburgh Penguins and the Vegas Golden Knights saying they had until March 31, 2023, to reach an agreement to take their local television rights back. Warner Bros. Discovery, the owners of the networks, intends to leave the regional sports networks business. If a deal is not reached the networks will file for Chapter 7 bankruptcy. The Seattle Kraken's deal with Root Sports Northwest is not affected because Warner Bros. Discovery only has minority control of that network.

On March 14, Diamond Sports Group, the operator of the Bally Sports regional sports networks, filed for Chapter 11 bankruptcy. Diamond plans to continue to broadcast games for the 12 NHL teams it has regional rights to while it plans to separate from majority parent Sinclair Broadcast Group as part of the reorganization.

Personnel
The Seattle Kraken hired Eddie Olczyk as a TV color analyst, joining John Forslund and J. T. Brown on a three-person booth for a majority of games. Olczyk will continue to hold the same position with TNT on a concurrent basis.

The New Jersey Devils hired Bill Spaulding as the team's new TV play-by-play announcer, replacing Steve Cangialosi.

The Chicago Blackhawks promoted Patrick Sharp to a full-time TV color analyst, splitting duties with Troy Murray. The team also announced that Colby Cohen and Caley Chelios will contribute game analysis and other content on both TV and radio.

International 
After selling its stake in Disney Streaming, the NHL partnered with Sportradar (which had a ten-year deal with the league for data and video distribution) to assume the operations of its international streaming service NHL.tv.

See also
2022–23 NHL transactions
List of 2022–23 NHL Three Star Awards
2022–23 NHL suspensions and fines
2022 in sports
2023 in sports

Notes

References

NHL